A is the first letter of the Latin and English alphabet.

A may also refer to:

Science and technology

Quantities and units 
 a, a measure for the attraction between particles in the Van der Waals equation
 A value, a measure of substituent effects on the stereochemistry of cyclohexane
 absorbance (A)
 acceleration (a)
 activity (chemistry) (a)
 adsorption (a)
 annum (a), for year 
 are (a), a unit of area (equal to 100 square metres; redirects to hectare)
 atto- (a-), the SI prefix meaning 10−18
 Ampere (A), unit of electric current
 ångström (Å) a unit of length (equal to 1 metres)
 area (A)
 attenuation coefficient (a) 
 Bohr radius (a0) 
 chemical affinity (A)
 gain (electronics) (A)
 Hall coefficient (AH)
 Hamaker constant (A)
 Helmholtz free energy (A)
 Hyperfine coupling constant (a or A)
 magnetic vector potential (A)
 mass number of a nuclide (A)
 pre-exponential factor (A)
 one of the reciprocal lattice vectors  (a*)
 relative atomic mass (Ar)
 Richardson's constant (A)
 rotational constant (A)
 specific surface area (a)
 thermal diffusivity (a)
 unit cell length (a)

Astronomy 
 A whitish-blue class of stars in the Morgan–Keenan system; see Stellar classification
 Part of the provisional designation of a comet (e.g., C/1760 A1), indicating a January 1 through 15 discovery
 The semi-major axis of an orbit

Biology
 A+ and A−, human blood types
 Vitamin A, also called retinol, an essential human nutrient
 Haplogroup A (mtDNA), a human mitochondrial DNA (mtDNA) haplogroup
 Haplogroup A (Y-DNA), a Y-chromosomal DNA (Y-DNA) haplogroup
 Adenine, a nucleic acid
 Adenosine, a nucleoside
 A (or Ala), abbreviation for amino acid alanine
 ATC code A, Alimentary tract and metabolism, a section of the Anatomical Therapeutic Chemical Classification System

Computing

Programming languages
 A+ (programming language)
 A♯, an object-oriented functional programming language
 A Sharp (.NET) (also written "A#"), a port of Ada to the Microsoft .NET Platform
 BASIC A+

Other uses in computing
 A* search algorithm, a pathfinding algorithm
 A-0 System, an early computer compiler
 , the HTML element for an anchor tag
 a, equivalent (qname) to the RDF Schema Property rdf:type
 A level of web accessibility defined by the Web Content Accessibility Guidelines
 The address record type of DNS, defined in RFC 1035

Mathematics and logic 
 A numerical digit meaning ten in hexadecimal and other positional numeral systems with a radix of 11 or greater
 Sometimes in blackboard bold represents the algebraic numbers (U+1D538 in Unicode)
 Universal affirmative, one of the four types of categorical proposition in logic
 Mills' constant is represented by the symbol A
 Glaisher–Kinkelin constant is also often represented by the symbol A

Other uses in science and technology

 A battery, a vacuum tube filament type battery
 A battery (size), a standard battery size
 Anode, an electrode
 A, historical symbol for chemical element argon, currently Ar
 The center of a hexagonal face of the Brillouin zone of a hexagonal lattice, in physics

Arts and media

Books
 "A", a major poem by twentieth century author Louis Zukofsky
 a, A Novel, by twentieth century artist Andy Warhol
 A, the name of the Fourth Raikage, the leader of Kumogakure in the Naruto manga series
 A (Pretty Little Liars), the main antagonist in the Pretty Little Liars book and TV series
 A (for "adultery"), the titular letter in the novel The Scarlet Letter
 "A" Is for Alibi, the first novel in Sue Grafton's "Alphabet mystery" series, published in 1982
 Matthew Arnold, who used the pseudonym "A"
 Isaac Asimov, who used the pseudonym "Dr. A"
 Alexander Pope, who used the pseudonym "A"

Film and TV

Films
 A (1965 film), a short film animated by Jan Lenica
 A (1998 Kannada film), an Indian movie directed by Upendra
 A (1998 Japanese film), a documentary film about a Buddhist sect called "A"
 A (2002 film), a British documentary film

Film ratings 
 A, a rating in India's Central Board of Film Certification
 A certificate, a film rating used by the Canadian motion picture rating system
 A, a British Board of Film Classification rating used from 1912 to 1982, see History of British film certificates

Television 
CTV 2, a Canadian television system formerly known as A-Channel and A
A, the main antagonist and unknown character of the show Pretty Little Liars
"A" (The Walking Dead), an episode of the television series The Walking Dead
A, code name of Ange, the main protagonist of the anime show Princess Principal
"A"-logo for the Spanish network Antena 3.
A, the production code for the 1963 Doctor Who serial An Unearthly Child

Music 
 A (musical note), the sixth solfège note
 A major, a scale
 A minor, a scale
 A major chord; see Chord names and symbols (popular music)

Performers
 A (band), a British alternative rock band

Albums
 A (Agnetha Fältskog album), 2013
 A (Cass McCombs album), 2003
 A (Jimmy Raney album), 1957
 A (Jethro Tull album), 1980
 A (Usher and Zaytoven album), 2018
 A, a Denki Groove album (read as "Ace")
 A (Ayumi Hamasaki EP), 1999
 A (single album), a 2015 single by the Korean band Big Bang
 A!, Alexa Feser 2019
A' (album), an album by Afrirampo

Songs
 A or Side A, the top or first side of a gramophone record
 "A" (Rainbow song), a 2010 single by Rainbow
 "A", song by A from 'A' vs. Monkey Kong
 "A", song by Got7 from Got Love (2014) 
 "A", song by the band Barenaked Ladies from Maybe You Should Drive
 "A", song by Cartel from Chroma
 "A", a song in the Dance Dance Revolution video game series, by DJ Amuro

Other media
 /a/, the anime and manga section on 4chan
 A, a Japanese video game rating in the Computer Entertainment Rating Organization suitable for all ages.

Geography
 Austria, on the vehicle registration plates of the European Union
"The A", a nickname for the U.S. city of Atlanta, Georgia

Linguistics

Letters
 A (or a), the first letter of the Latin alphabet
 A (Bengali), the romanized name of the Bengali letter অ
 A (cuneiform), the romanized name of a cuneiform sign
 A (Cyrillic) (A or а), the first letter of the Cyrillic alphabet
 A (kana) (or a), the romanized name of the Hiragana syllable letter あ and of the Katakana syllable letter ア used in Japanese, which may also be used to represent Asia
 Alpha (Α or α), the first letter of the Greek alphabet

Other uses in linguistics
 A and an, the indefinite article in English
 A, a glossing abbreviation for agent-like argument of canonical transitive verb
 , the IPA representation of the open front unrounded vowel
 , the IPA representation of the open back unrounded vowel
 a., an abbreviation of ante (Latin for "before") used in etymologies

People
 A (pharaoh), an Egyptian pharaoh
 A Martinez, an American actor and singer
 Matthew Arnold, who used the pseudonym "A"
 Isaac Asimov, who used the pseudonym "Dr. A"
 Alexander Pope, who used the pseudonym "A"
 Brfxxccxxmnpcccclllmmnprxvclmnckssqlbb11116, a Swedish child born in 1991, alternately called "A"

Philosophy and religion
 A, the Dominical letter of a common year starting on Sunday
 Scarlet A, symbol for atheism adopted by the Out Campaign, a public awareness initiated by Elizabeth Cornwell and Richard Dawkins
 Alpha, (sometimes A) in Christian theology, a metaphor for the beginning/creation of time and matter
 An anarchist symbol, an A within a circle

Transport

Automobile
 Ford Model A, a name used by two separate cars produced by the Ford Motor Company:
 Ford Model A (1903–04)
 Ford Model A (1927–31)
 Geometry A, an electric mid-size sedan by Geely Auto

Rail
 A (S-train) a service on the S-train network in Copenhagen
 Line A of the Buenos Aires Subte
 Line A (Prague Metro)
 NZR A class (disambiguation) two New Zealand steam locomotive classes
 United States
 A (Los Angeles Railway)
 A (New York City Subway service), also known as the "A Eighth Avenue Express"
 Alton Railroad (reporting mark)
 A Line (Los Angeles Metro) 
 Britain
 LCDR A class, British 0-4-4T steam locomotives introduced in 1875
 LD&ECR Class A, British 0-6-2T steam locomotives introduced in 1895
 LNWR Class A, British 0-8-0 steam locomotives introduced in 1893
 NER Class A, British 2-4-2T steam locomotives introduced in 1886
 SER A class, British 4-4-0 steam locomotives introduced in 1879
 Taff Vale Railway A class, British 0-6-2T steam locomotives introduced in 1914

Ships
A (motor yacht) (M/Y A), a 119m yacht owned by Andrey Melnichenko
A (sailing yacht) (S/Y A), a 143m yacht owned by Andrey Melnichenko
 , a Kaiserliche Marine tanker

Other uses
 A (grade), an academic grade
 A series of paper sizes defined by ISO 216, e.g. A4, A5 sizes
 A formation, an American football offensive formation
 A-Frame, a type of structure
 Ace, a playing card
 Agilent Technologies, with U.S. ticker symbol A
 Sentinel Peak (Arizona), more commonly known as "A" Mountain for the man-made rock formation in the shape of the letter
 Alfa, the military time zone code for UTC+01:00
 Farmall A, a tractor produced by International Harvester from 1939 to 1947

See also
 Å (disambiguation)
 ⓐ and Ⓐ, see Enclosed Alphanumerics
 Class A (disambiguation)
 Model A (disambiguation)
 Circled a (disambiguation)
 Single-A, or Class A, a classification of minor league baseball
 A band (disambiguation)
 A class (disambiguation)
 A type (disambiguation)
 Aleph (disambiguation)
 Alpha (disambiguation)
 A1 (disambiguation)
 AA (disambiguation)
 AAA (disambiguation)
 AAAA (disambiguation)